Sijaval (also Romanized as Seijuwol ; also known as Theijuwoll) is a city in Jafarbay-ye Jonubi Rural District, in the Central District of Torkaman County, Golestan Province, Iran. At the 2015 census, its population was 3,747, in 976 families.

References 

Populated places in Torkaman County